This article is a list of Stormwatch members.

Stormwatch Prime

Issues #1–10
After the losing most of the team, Stormwatch is restructured and new recruits are added prior to issue #1. Backlash is promoted to head of training.

Issues #11–26
Henry Bendix is stripped of his position in issue #11 and replaced by his second-in-command Synergy, also known as Christine Trelane. Team assignments are variable from this point on, grouping operatives and assigning command as situations dictate.

Issue #27 till Fire from Heaven
The team is rebuilt after the defeat of Despot (issue #27) and Henry Bendix is again Weatherman, with Synergy as his second.

After Fire from Heaven
After the Fire from Heaven crossover, a major restructuring of Stormwatch occurred in Warren Ellis' first issue. Battalion became head of training, and Synergy to head of recruitment. Molly Perkins moved to the Analysis Deck of Skywatch. Sunburst and Nautica left Stormwatch service and worked as Earth-based analysts for Skywatch. Blademaster, Cannon, Comanche, Pagan, Prism and Undertow were dismissed, with lifetime U.N.-provided salary and accommodations. Undertow is killed soon after.

After Change or Die
After the Change or Die storyline, Henry Bendix was missing and presumed dead. Jackson King became Weatherman and Molly Perkins became head of analysis. The Stormwatch field teams were restructured. Stormwatch Black was officially dissolved but retained in secret.

After Skywatch is destroyed in WildC.A.T.s/Aliens #1, Stormwatch was dissolved. Stormwatch Black became the Authority at the end of the series, with the addition of former "secret" Stormwatch members Midnighter & Apollo as well as the second Doctor and the second Engineer.

Alternate universe Stormwatch
In the Bleed storyline, Stormwatch observed events unfold on a parallel Earth that had never been visited by the Daemonites or Kherubim. In this universe, Battalion had been removed from Stormwatch after a catastrophic attack on the Skywatch space station and was replaced as Weatherman by Jack Hawksmoor, with Synergy retaining her position as second-in-command. Jack's bodyguard and personal assistant was Freefall of Gen¹³, going by her real name Roxanne Spaulding. His maid in the United States was Anna, Gen¹³s domestic android. He commanded a version of Stormwatch employing twenty-three super-powered beings with twenty field operatives divided into five teams.

The New 52 DC relaunch (issues #1–18, issue #30)

Magenta timeline (issues #19–29)
A new Stormwatch team was assembled by the Shadow Lords after learning the Kollective had created an alternate timeline by murdering Adam One, thereby erasing the previous Stormwatch from existence. Following the defeat of the Kollective, the Magenta Timeline was obliterated with reality reverting to its original continuum and restoring the previous incarnation of Stormwatch in issue #30.

Other characters appearing in Stormwatch
 Deathtrap
 Union
 Changers
 Pavlo Stupka

References